Below is a list of squads used in the 1964 Arab Cup.

Iraq
Coach: Adil Basher

Jordan
Coach: Shehadeh Mousa

Kuwait
Coach:  Saleh El Wahsh

Lebanon
Coach: Joseph Nalbandian

Libya
Coach:

External links
Details - rsssf.com

Squad
1964